Inermocoelotes jurinitschi is a funnel-web spider species found in Bulgaria.

Description
Male reaches 8,35 mm in total length (cephalothorax - 4,03 mm) . Pedipalp femur cylindriform with weak spines ventrally on basal side and stout spines dorsally on apical side. Patella with stout spines. Tibia with weak and stout spines and with characteristic blunt apophysis. Cymbium with normal tip provided with some stout spines and with characteristic of all Coelotes sensu lato lateral margin. The most characteristic for the bulb is the long and narrow conductor.

See also 
 List of Agelenidae species

References 

Inermocoelotes
Spiders of Europe
Spiders described in 1915